The men's 100 metre breaststroke event at the 2014 Commonwealth Games as part of the swimming programme took place on 25 and 26 July at the Tollcross International Swimming Centre in Glasgow, Scotland.

The medals were presented by David Wilkie, Olympic, World and Commonwealth champion and the quaichs were presented by Dursley Stott, Honorary President of the Commonwealth Games Association of the Isle of Man. Adam Peaty of England won the Commonwealth title, just ahead of South Africa's Olympic champion and world record holder Cameron van der Burgh, with 200 metre breaststroke Commonwealth champion Ross Murdoch of Scotland third. The same three athletes finished in the same three positions in the event at the 2015 World Aquatics Championships.

Records
Prior to this competition, the existing world and Commonwealth Games records were as follows.

The following records were established during the competition:

Results

Heats

Semifinals

Final

References

External links

Men's 100 metre breaststroke
Commonwealth Games